Lieutenant Francis May Simonds (17 October 1894 – 10 July 1961) was an American World War I flying ace credited with five aerial victories.

Biography
Captain of the football team and a member of the varsity eight in his junior year, Francis May Simonds graduated from Columbia University in 1916. Simonds was assigned to the 147th Aero Squadron on 23 February 1918. He scored five aerial victories from July through October 1918.

See also

 List of World War I flying aces from the United States

References

Bibliography
 American Aces of World War I. Norman Franks, Harry Dempsey. Osprey Publishing, 2001. , .

1894 births
1961 deaths
American World War I flying aces
Aviators from New York (state)
People from Flushing, Queens
Recipients of the Croix de Guerre 1914–1918 (France)
Columbia Lions football players
Sportspeople from Queens, New York
Players of American football from New York City